Qaratəpə (known as Pokrovka until 1999) is a village and municipality in the Sabirabad Rayon of Azerbaijan. It has a population of 2,849.

Notable natives 

 Mubariz Ahmadov — National Hero of Azerbaijan.

References

Populated places in Sabirabad District